Malek Belarbi (born 21 July 1959) is a Moroccan French singer-songwriter, record producer and poet. His mother, Marie-Louise Belarbi, was a bookseller and publisher.

References

External links
Official website

20th-century Moroccan male singers
Moroccan emigrants to France
French male writers
Alumni of Lycée Lyautey (Casablanca)
People from Casablanca
People from Rabat
Living people
1959 births